Pachnoda is a genus of beetles from the subfamily Cetoniinae with nearly all of the species living in Africa. The limit of the genus is given by the presence of internal lobes in their aedeagi.

Species
List of species:

 Pachnoda abyssinica (Blanchard, 1842)
 Pachnoda acutipennis (Kolbe, 1914)
 Pachnoda adelpha Kolbe, 1914
 Pachnoda albini Bourgoin, 1921
 Pachnoda allardi Ruter, 1969
 Pachnoda alluaudi Bourgoin, 1913
 Pachnoda antoinei Beinhundner, 2006
 Pachnoda ardoini Ruter, 1978
 Pachnoda arrowi Bourgoin, 1913
 Pachnoda babaulti Bourgoin, 1921
 Pachnoda basilewskyi Ruter, 1953
 Pachnoda bax (Gory & Percheron, 1833)
 Pachnoda berliozi Rigout, 1980
 Pachnoda bourgeoni Moser, 1924
 Pachnoda bourgoini Burgeon, 1931
 Pachnoda bousqueti Rigout, 1989
 Pachnoda bukobensis Moser, 1914
 Pachnoda cervenkai Krajcik, 2002
 Pachnoda chionopleura Fairmaire, 1884
 Pachnoda chireyi Legrand, 1993
 Pachnoda cincticollis Moser, 1914
 Pachnoda collinsi Rigout, 1985
 Pachnoda concolor Schürhoff, 1938
 Pachnoda congoensis Moser, 1914
 Pachnoda coolsi Rigout, 1984
 Pachnoda cordata (Drury, 1773)
 Pachnoda crassa Schaum, 1848
 Pachnoda crinita Schürhoff, 1938
 Pachnoda dargei Rigout, 1987
 Pachnoda dechambrei Rigout, 1986
 Pachnoda demoulini Rigout, 1978
 Pachnoda denuttae Ruter, 1972
 Pachnoda dimidiaticollis Moser, 1915
 Pachnoda discolor Kolbe, 1895
 Pachnoda divisa Gerstaecker, 1884
 Pachnoda durandi Ruter, 1958
 Pachnoda elegantissima Csiki, 1909
 Pachnoda ephippiata Gerstaecker, 1867
 Pachnoda fairmairei (Raffray, 1877)
 Pachnoda fasciata (Fabricius, 1775)
 Pachnoda fedierei Rigout, 1989
 Pachnoda fissipunctum Kraatz, 1885
 Pachnoda fromenti Rigout, 1981
 Pachnoda frontalis (Harold, 1878)
 Pachnoda helleri Moser, 1910
 Pachnoda histrio (Fabricius, 1775)
 Pachnoda histrioides (Pouillaude, 1914)
 Pachnoda impressa (Goldfuss, 1805)
 Pachnoda inscripta (Gory & Percheron, 1833)
 Pachnoda interrupta (Olivier, 1789)
 Pachnoda jokoensis Moser, 1915
 Pachnoda katangensis Burgeon, 1931
 Pachnoda kiellandi Rigout, 1989
 Pachnoda knirschi Rigout, 1984
 Pachnoda kordofana Moser, 1914
 Pachnoda kühbandneri Beinhundner, 1997
 Pachnoda kustai (Nonfried, 1892)
 Pachnoda lamottei Ruter, 1954
 Pachnoda lateristicta Kolbe, 1910
 Pachnoda leclercqi Rigout, 1985
 Pachnoda leonina Schoch, 1896
 Pachnoda leopoldiana Burgeon, 1931
 Pachnoda lequeuxi Rigout, 1979
 Pachnoda lerui Rigout, 1989
 Pachnoda limbata (Fabricius, 1775)
 Pachnoda maculipennis Moser, 1918
 Pachnoda madaraszi Csiki, 1909
 Pachnoda madgei Rigout, 1995
 Pachnoda marginata (Drury, 1773)
 Pachnoda massajae Gestro, 1881
 Pachnoda mastrucata Gerstaecker, 1884
 Pachnoda meloui Bourgoin, 1915
 Pachnoda nigritarsis Harold, 1880
 Pachnoda nigroplagiata Kraatz, 1900
 Pachnoda nutricia Rigout, 1980
 Pachnoda onorei Rigout, 1980
 Pachnoda orphanula (Herbst, 1790)
 Pachnoda pendemi Schürhoff, 1938
 Pachnoda picturata Boheman, 1860
 Pachnoda poggei (Harold, 1878)
 Pachnoda polita Blanchard, 1842
 Pachnoda postica (Gory & Percheron, 1833)
 Pachnoda postmedia Moser, 1915
 Pachnoda praecellens Moser, 1908
 Pachnoda prasina Karsch, 1881
 Pachnoda rectangularis Vuillet, 1911
 Pachnoda rougemonti Rigout, 1984
 Pachnoda rubriventris Moser, 1910
 Pachnoda rubrocincta Hope, 1847
 Pachnoda rufa (De Geer, 1778)
 Pachnoda rufomarginata Burmeister, 1842
 Pachnoda rwandana Rigout, 1984
 Pachnoda savignyi (Gory & Percheron, 1833)
 Pachnoda sciencesnati Rigout, 1989
 Pachnoda semiflava Kraatz, 1900
 Pachnoda sinuata (Fabricius, 1775)
 Pachnoda sjoestedti Moser, 1921
 Pachnoda spinipennis Moser, 1914
 Pachnoda steheleni Schaum, 1841
 Pachnoda stehelini (Schaum, 1841)
 Pachnoda tessmanni Schürhoff, 1938
 Pachnoda thoracica (Fabricius, 1775)
 Pachnoda tridentata (Olivier, 1789)
 Pachnoda trimaculata Kraatz, 1885
 Pachnoda tshikambai Rigout, 1984
 Pachnoda uelensis Burgeon, 1931
 Pachnoda upangwana Moser, 1918
 Pachnoda vethi Lansberge, 1886
 Pachnoda viridana Blanchard, 1850
 Pachnoda viridiflua Kraatz, 1900
 Pachnoda vitticollis Moser, 1914
 Pachnoda vossi Kolbe, 1892
 Pachnoda vuilleti Bourgoin, 1914
 Pachnoda watulegei Rigout, 1981
 Pachnoda werneri Beinhunder, 1993

Gallery

References

Bibliography

 Legrand (J.-Ph.) - 1993, Deux nouvelles cétoines de l'Est africain, Bulletin de la Société Sciences Nat, 77, p. 3-4.
 Le Thaut (P.) - 2004, Contribution à la distribution de Pachnoda fasciata (Fabricius 1775) en Arabie Saoudite, Cetoniimania 1(1), pp. 28–32
 Rigout (J.) - 1977, La détermination des Pachnoda, Bulletin de la Société Sciences Nat, 16, pp. 16–14, 1 col. plate.
 Rigout (J.) - 1978, Description d'une nouvelle espèce de Pachnoda et note synonymique sur une sous-espèce, Bulletin de la Société Sciences Nat, 17, pp. 2–4.
 Rigout (J.) - 1979, Note sur quelques Pachnoda du Sud-Est Rwanda, Bulletin de la Société Sciences Nat, 21, pp. 10–12, 1 col. plate.
 Rigout (J.) - 1980, Description d'une nouvelle espèce de Pachnoda de la Côte d'Ivoire, Bulletin de la Société Sciences Nat, 24, pp. 2–3.
 Rigout (J.) - 1980, Révision des Pachnoda des groupes postmedia Moser et postica Gory & Percheron, Bulletin de la Société Sciences Nat, 26, pp. 14–21, 1 col. plate.
 Rigout (J.) - 1981, Les Pachnoda du groupe ephippiata Gerstraecker, Bulletin de la Société Sciences Nat, 29 & 30, pp. 51–54, 1 col. plate.
 Rigout (J.) - 1983, Les petites Pachnoda vert et jaune, Bulletin de la Société Sciences Nat, 35, pp. 1–6, 1 col. plate.
 Rigout (J.) - 1984, Le genre Pachnoda : note synonymique et description d'insectes nouveaux, Bulletin de la Société Sciences Nat, 43, pp. 1–3.
 Rigout (J.) - 1984, Note pour servir à l'élaboration d'un catalogue du genre Pachnoda, Bulletin de la Société Sciences Nat, 44, pp. 11–15.
 Rigout (J.) - 1985, Note sur les Pachnoda, Bulletin de la Société Sciences Nat, 46, pp. 3–6.
 Rigout (J.) - 1985, Note sur quelques espèces du genre Pachnoda, Bulletin de la Société Sciences Nat, 47, pp. 25–26.
 Rigout (J.) - 1987, Description d'une nouvelle espèce et de trois nouvelles sous-espèces de Pachnoda et note sur P. aemula Bourgoin et P. arborescens Vigors, Bulletin de la Société Sciences Nat, 53, pp. 27–53.
 Rigout (J.) - 1989, Un Pachnoda nouveau de l'Uganda, Bulletin de la Société Sciences Nat, 64, p. 18.
 Rigout (J.) - 1995, Un nouveau Pachnoda du Mali, Bulletin de la Société Sciences Nat, 83, p. 8.

Cetoniinae
Scarabaeidae genera